Martín Varsavsky Waisman-Diamond (born April 26, 1960) is an Argentine entrepreneur based in Spain who founded several companies worldwide, including Urban Capital, Medicorp Sciences, Viatel, Jazztel, EINSTEINet, Ya.com, Eolia, FON and, most recently, Prelude (now Inception), Overture Life and Goggo Network. This serial entrepreneur condition made Forbes Magazine describe him as Young, Rich & Restless back in 1999.

Early life and education

Born to Carlos Varsavsky and Silvia Waisman-Diamond, Varsavsky attended primary school at the New Model School and the Colegio Nicolás Avellaneda high school. He was raised in the Jewish faith.

At the age of 17, he moved with his family to the United States as a refugee supported and assisted by B'nai B'rith, following the forced disappearance of his cousin, David Horacio Varsavsky. In 1981 he obtained a BA at the New York University, in 1983 he earned an MA in International Affairs from Columbia University and in 1985 an MBA at Columbia Business School.

Career
In 1984, at the age of 24 and still in college, Varsavsky created Urban Capital Corporation, a real estate company in New York that was one of the early developers of loft apartments. Urban Capital Corporation purchased industrial buildings and recycled them into residential apartments and offices, developing up to 50 thousand square meters in the SoHo and Tribeca neighborhoods of New York City.

In 1986, together with Argentine scientist Claudio Cuello and César Milstein (Medical Science Nobel Prize), Varsavsky founded Medicorp Sciences, a biotechnology company in which he is still a shareholder. Based in Montreal, Medicorp Sciences were among the first to make AIDS and Cancer products of different kinds (HIV and PSA tests).

In 1991, Varsavsky founded the telecommunications company Viatel in Colorado, which operated a call-back service, as an alternative traditional long-distance operators, similar to Econophone. Viatel later became an alternative telecommunications service provider in France, Belgium, Italy, Spain and the United Kingdom. In 1997 Varsavsky resigned his official positions and sold his Viatel shares.

In July 1995, Varsavsky moved to Madrid, Spain. From 1999 to 2011 he taught courses on entrepreneurship at IE Business School (formerly Instituto de Empresa) in Spain. In 1997, Varsavsky founded Jazztel, an alternative telecommunications access provider in the Iberian Peninsula. Headquartered in Madrid and with its own infrastructure, the company became a telecommunications operator offering bandwidth for residential and commercial customers, competing with Telefónica. Jazztel PLC went public (IPO) in December 1999.

In 1999, he created Ya.com Internet Factory, a Spanish internet services/DSL provider that also included the Spanish language online travel agency Viajar.com (later sold to Bravofly Rumbo Group. Ya.com was owned by Jazztel (70%), Varsavsky (10%) and the company's' staff (20%). It was sold in 2000 to T-Online International, Deutsche Telekom's Internet subsidiary for 550 million euros.

In 2000, Varsavsky created EINSTEINet AG, an application service provider (ASP) in Germany. Einsteinet was a company built on the premise that most applications were going to migrate from people's PCs to the internet.  EINSTEINet did not materialize, the company was sold and represented losses for Varsavsky for 35 million euros.

He launched the company Fon in Madrid at the end of 2005, which provides international WiFi services using user-generated infrastructure. Fon is backed by equity investors Google, Skype, Microsoft, Index Ventures Qualcomm Ventures, and Deutsche Telekom. In 2012, the network reached over 7 million WiFi hotspots in several countries.

In 2015, backed by Lee Equity, Martin founded Prelude Fertility/Inception now the largest chain of fertility clinics in the USA.

In 2017, Martin founded Overture Life, focused on automating the embryology lab. Overture is backed by Khosla Ventures, Marc Benioff and Allen & Company.

In 2018 Martin founded Goggo Network, an Axel Springer/Softbank backed startup that is helping develop the legal and engineering framework for fleets of autonomous vehicles and plans to deploy these fleets.

In 2021, Martin founded Levere Holdings, a publicly-traded (NASDAQ: LVRA) Special Purpose Acquisition Company (SPAC) seeking to invest and merge with a business that will play a key role in the future of mobility in EMEA, focusing on the development of mobility services, connected vehicles, electric vehicles and autonomous driving.

Varsavsky has written articles on business and international relations for El País, Newsweek, El Mundo (Spain), and The Huffington Post, and is a frequent speaker at conferences like Next Conference. Varsavsky is also a blogger and contributor to the LinkedIn Influencers Program, where he writes and gives talks on entrepreneurship and technology. In 2012 Varsavsky began teaching entrepreneurship at Columbia University in New York City.

He has been an investment partner in early-stage companies including iTravel, Aura Biosciences, Menéame, Netvibes, Plazes, Technorati, Eloquii, Dopplr, Tumblr, Hipertextual, Busuu, 23andMe, MUBI and Result. Outside of telecommunications, he was the majority shareholder of the wind park El Moralejo (a renewable energy generator) and Proesa, owner of the fashion labels Sybilla and Jocomomola.

Currently, Varsavsky is Executive Chairman and Founder of Prelude Fertility and Chief Executive Officer and Founder of Overture Life.

Philanthropic work 

Varsavsky is founder and president of the Varsavsky Foundation, which works to improve educational conditions in several countries. The foundation promotes the education portals Educ.ar in Argentina and Educarchile.cl in Chile, aiming to democratize and modernize the educational systems in both countries.

He is also founder and president of the Safe Democracy Foundation, devoted to contributing to debates in international affairs. The foundation's goal is to promote fair, transparent and safe democracy.

The Safe Democracy Foundation and the Club of Madrid organized the Atocha Workshop in March 2005 and the international Summit on Terrorism, Democracy and Security.

Personal life
Varsavsky married Nina Wiegand on July 22, 2009, in Hawaii. He has seven children.

Awards and recognition 
Varsavsky is the recipient of various honors and rewards, among them:

 World Technology, Fon: The most innovative organization in technology world (2006)
 Pickering Prize, Columbia University (2003)
 Spanish Entrepreneur of the Year, iBest (2000)
 Global Leader for Tomorrow, World Economic Forum (2000)
 European Entrepreneur of the Year, ECTA (1999)
 European Telecommunications Entrepreneur of the Year (1998)
 Finalist in the Entrepreneur of the Year contest, New York City (1995)

References

External links 

 
 Varsavsky Foundation
 Video interview with Martín Varsavsky (English, German intro and subtitles)
 Interview with Martin Varsavsky, 2012
 Interview, Forbes Magazine Interview, Harvard Business School

1960 births
Columbia Business School alumni
Living people
Spanish businesspeople
Argentine Jews
Argentine emigrants to Spain
Argentine philanthropists
Spanish bloggers
School of International and Public Affairs, Columbia University alumni
New York University alumni